Upinder Singh Bhalla (born 1963) is an Indian computational neuroscientist, academic and a professor at National Centre for Biological Sciences of the Tata Institute of Fundamental Research. He is known for his studies on neuronal and synaptic signalling in memory and olfactory coding using computational and experimental methods and is an elected fellow of the Indian Academy of Sciences and the Indian National Science Academy. The Council of Scientific and Industrial Research, the apex agency of the Government of India for scientific research, awarded him the Shanti Swarup Bhatnagar Prize for Science and Technology, one of the highest Indian science awards, in 2007, for his contributions to biological sciences. The Infosys Science Foundation awarded him the Infosys Prize 2017 in Life Sciences for his pioneering contributions to the understanding of the brain's computational machinery.

Biography 
Upinder S. Bhalla, born in the Indian capital of Delhi to an academic couple who were professors at Jawaharlal Nehru University, enrolled himself at the Indian Institute of Technology, Kanpur for an integrated master's program but discontinued his studies at IITK after one year to join Cambridge University from where he graduated in natural sciences. Subsequently, he secured a PhD under the guidance of James M. Bower from California Institute of Technology in 1993 and did his post doctoral studies at the laboratory of Ravi Iyengar at Mount Sinai School of Medicine. Returning to India, he joined National Centre for Biological Sciences, a Bengaluru-based biological research centre of Tata Institute of Fundamental Research where he became an assistant professor in 2002 and an associate professor in 2003, before becoming a professor in 2012. He heads a laboratory at NCBS where he hosts a number of research associates, post-doctoral fellows and doctoral students who are involved in the research on Memory and Plasticity through computational and experimental methods.

Legacy 
Bhalla's research has widened our understanding of memory functioning and he has contributed to understanding the neural coding of olfactory information. His team at NCBS uses optogenetic techniques for monitoring brain cell activity and uses light to stimulate the activity. Bhalla and his colleagues developed MOOSE (Multiscale Object-Oriented Simulation Environment), a simulation tool which helps build computer models of molecules and molecular networks. He has mentored several research scholars in their doctoral and post-doctoral studies and is a member of the council of the Indian National Science Academy.

Awards and honours 
Bhalla received the Shanti Swarup Bhatnagar Prize of the Council of Scientific and Industrial Research in 2007 for his contributions to Biological Sciences. The same year, the Indian Academy of Sciences elected him as their fellow. Three years later, he also became an elected fellow of the Indian National Science Academy. In 2017, he received the Infosys Prize in Life Sciences for the excellent work he has been doing for the last two decades which is now not only nationally but internationally recognised as one of the fundamental ways of how we study the role of olfaction in behaviour.

Selected bibliography

See also 
 James M. Bower
 Ravi Iyengar

Notes

References

External links 
 
 
 
 

Recipients of the Shanti Swarup Bhatnagar Award in Biological Science
1963 births
Living people
Scientists from Delhi
IIT Kanpur alumni
Alumni of the University of Cambridge
California Institute of Technology alumni
Icahn School of Medicine at Mount Sinai alumni
Academic staff of the National Centre for Biological Sciences
Fellows of the Indian Academy of Sciences
Fellows of the Indian National Science Academy
Indian neuroscientists
Indian scientific authors
20th-century Indian biologists